Antonio Manuel Sarmiento García (born 27 July 1979) is a Spanish footballer who plays for CD Pozoblanco as a central midfielder.

Football career
Born in Villarrubia de los Ojos, Córdoba, Andalusia, Sarmiento made his senior debuts for Montilla CF. In the 1999 summer he moved to Córdoba CF, initially assigned to the reserves in Tercera División.

Sarmiento played his first match as a professional on 12 September 1999, replacing Alberto Saavedra in a 0–0 away draw against Mérida UD in the Segunda División championship. He appeared in five matches during the campaign, all from the bench.

Sarmiento spent the 2000–01 season on loan at Polideportivo Ejido, in Segunda División B. He was definitely promoted to the main squad after his return, and appeared regularly for the Verdiblancos during the following campaigns.

On 21 August 2003 Sarmiento moved to Cultural y Deportiva Leonesa, also in a temporary deal. He returned to Córdoba in June 2004, but after appearing sparingly for the latter in 2004–05, he rescinded his link and moved to Lucena CF in the fourth level.

Sarmiento quickly became an important midfield unit for Lucena, appearing regularly and achieving promotion to the third level in 2007. In June 2009 he signed a new deal with the club, being appointed captain in the following year.

Sarmiento played his 200th match for the club on 27 November 2011, starting in a 1–1 home draw against Sporting Villanueva Promesas. He subsequently renewed his contract on 23 June 2012, and was an undisputed starter in the following campaigns.

References

External links

1979 births
Living people
Sportspeople from the Province of Córdoba (Spain)
Spanish footballers
Footballers from Andalusia
Association football midfielders
Segunda División players
Segunda División B players
Tercera División players
Córdoba CF B players
Córdoba CF players
Polideportivo Ejido footballers
Cultural Leonesa footballers
Lucena CF players